Tobasco is an unincorporated community in Clermont County, in the U.S. state of Ohio.

History
A post office called Tobasco was established in 1878, and remained in operation until 1933. The community derives its name from Tabasco, in Mexico.

References

Unincorporated communities in Clermont County, Ohio
Unincorporated communities in Ohio